Athletics competitions at the 1947–48 Bolivarian Games were held in Lima, Perú, in December 1947 and January 1948.

A detailed history of the early editions of the Bolivarian Games between 1938 and 1989 was published in a book written (in Spanish) by José Gamarra Zorrilla, former president of the Bolivian Olympic Committee, and first president (1976–1982) of ODESUR.  Gold medal winners from Ecuador were published by the Comité Olímpico Ecuatoriano.

A total of 33 events were contested, 23 by men and 10 by women.   Unusually, 
cross country events (individual and team) were part of the games.

Medal summary

Medal winners were published.

Men

Notes
†: 20 kilometres ?

Women

Medal table (unofficial)

References

Athletics at the Bolivarian Games
Peru
Bolivarian Games
Peru
1948 in athletics (track and field)
1948 in Peruvian sport